Stepovich is a surname. Notable people with the surname include:

 Mike Stepovich (1919–2014), American lawyer and politician 
 Nick Stepovich (born 1957), American politician and businessman